Front Row for the Donkey Show is Faster Pussycat's first live album, released on July 7, 2009.

Track listing 
Track listing adopted from Discogs.

Credits
 Taime Downe: Lead vocals
 Michael Thomas: Guitar
 Xristian Simon: Guitar
 Danny Nordahl: Bass
 Chad Stewart: Drums

References

Faster Pussycat albums
2009 live albums